Scappo a casa is a 2019 Italian comedy film directed by Enrico Lando.

Cast

References

External links

2019 films
Films about immigration to Italy
Films directed by Enrico Lando
2010s Italian-language films
2019 comedy films
Italian comedy films
2010s Italian films